Dinny Lowry (born 1935) is an Irish former soccer player. Lowry played for St Patrick's Athletic F.C., Bohemians and Sligo Rovers in the League of Ireland. He played one match for Republic of Ireland.

Playing career

Club career
Lowry played youth football for Bulfin United before joining St Patrick's Athletic. He made his Pats debut in 1952 after earning one schoolboy and two youth caps

He later joined Bohemian, making two European appearances for the club. After Bohemians turned professional he became the second player to sign a professional contract on 11 March 1969.  He then transferred to Sligo Rovers.

International career
He earned one cap for Republic of Ireland national football team in 1962.
Lowry had a benefit game in August 1962.

Management career
He was Shamrock Rovers trainer during the 1980s and 1990s.

Honours
League of Ireland: 2
 St Patrick's Athletic F.C. – 1954–1955, 1955–1956
FAI Cup: 2
 St Patrick's Athletic F.C. – 1961
 Bohemians F.C. – 1970
PFAI Merit Award
 1995

References

Republic of Ireland association footballers
Association footballers from County Dublin
Association football goalkeepers
League of Ireland players
League of Ireland XI players
Bohemian F.C. players
St Patrick's Athletic F.C. players
Sligo Rovers F.C. players
Republic of Ireland international footballers
Republic of Ireland youth international footballers
Living people
1935 births